Zorzi (Giorgio) Alvise Baffo (11 August 1694 - 30 July 1768) was an Italian poet and senator of the Venetian Republic.

Baffo was born in Venice. He was, like Ruzante, Carlo Goldoni and Berto Barbarani, a major writer in the Venetian dialect. He wrote many erotic sonnets.

Baffo died in 1768 in the Palazzo Bellavite, Venice.

References 

1694 births
1768 deaths
18th-century Venetian writers
Italian poets
Italian male poets
Republic of Venice politicians